is a railway station on the Hakodate Main Line located in Nanae, Hokkaidō, Japan. It is operated by JR Hokkaido and has the station number "H68".

Lines

Station layout
The station has two platforms serving three tracks on the ground level.

Platforms

History
After the Hokkaido Railway was nationalized on 1 July 1907, Japanese Government Railways (JGR) took over control of the station. On 12 October 1909 the station became part of the Hakodate Main Line. On 1 April 1987, with the privatization of Japanese National Railways (JNR), the successor of JGR, control of the station passed to JR Hokkaido.

See also
 List of railway stations in Japan

References

Railway stations in Hokkaido Prefecture
Railway stations in Japan opened in 1903